The Society for European Philosophy (SEP) is a philosophical society founded in 1996. The organization sponsors an annual conference. It is the largest society for Continental philosophy in the UK.

History
SEP was founded at Birkbeck College, University of London on the 28 June 1996. The original meeting sought to bring together scholars from across the UK "working in the various non/analytical traditions of European philosophy". The first full conference was held at Lancaster University in 1998, with SEP holding an annual conference each year since then. SEP aims to promote the understanding of the various traditions of European Philosophy within the Anglo-American philosophical world, within academia more broadly, and within the wider public sphere. The annual conference is the largest event aimed at researchers and others interested in Modern European Philosophy in Europe. The annual conference has been held across the United Kingdom, as well as in Ireland, the Netherlands, Italy and Hungary.  From 2005 to 2019, the annual conference was held jointly with the Forum for European Philosophy. The 2023 conference will take place from the 3rd to the 5th of July 2023 and will be hosted by the Institute of Art Theory and Media Studies, Eötvös Loránd University (ELTE), in partnership with the Institute of Philosophy and the Faculty of Education and Psychology, ELTE Budapest, Hungary.

Executive Committee
There are currently 30 members of the SEP Committee from universities across the UK and Europe. 

Former chairpersons of SEP include Professor Beth Lord (2014 - 2018) and Professor Stella Sandford (2018 - 2021).

References

External links 
SEP website

Philosophical societies
Pan-European learned societies
1996 establishments in Europe
Organizations established in 1996
Continental philosophy organizations